Tartan Noir is a form of crime fiction particular to Scotland and Scottish writers.

Criticism
William McIlvanney has said that the whole genre is "ersatz." Charles Taylor has stated that the term has an "inescapably condescending tinge", noting "it's a touristy phrase, suggesting that there's something quaint about hard-boiled crime fiction that comes from the land of kilts and haggis."

Tartan Noir writers
 Lin Anderson
 Christopher Brookmyre
 Quintin Jardine
 Stuart MacBride
 Peter May
 Val McDermid
 William McIlvanney
 Denise Mina
 Caro Ramsay
 Ian Rankin

References

External links

Scottish literature
Crime fiction
Modern history of Scotland
20th century in Scotland
21st century in Scotland
Literature of the late modern period
Scottish literary movements
21st-century British literature
20th-century British literature
Noir fiction